Richard J. Tillman (September 5, 1911 – October 1983) was an American politician. He served as a Republican member for the 72nd district of the Florida House of Representatives.

Tillman was born in New York. He attended New York University Tandon School of Engineering. He moved to Florida in 1942 and worked as an engineer. In 1968 he was elected to represent the 72nd district of the Florida House of Representatives, serving until 1970. 

Tillman died in October 1983 at the Health First's Cape Canaveral Hospital in Cocoa Beach, Florida, at the age of 62.

References 

1911 births
1983 deaths
Politicians from New York City
Republican Party members of the Florida House of Representatives
20th-century American politicians
American engineers
20th-century American engineers
Polytechnic Institute of New York University alumni